Beňadiková is a village and municipality in Liptovský Mikuláš District in the Žilina Region of northern Slovakia.

History
In historical records the village was first mentioned in 1352.

Geography
The municipality lies at an altitude of 615 metres and covers an area of 4.975 km². It has a population of about 430 people.

Genealogical resources

The records for genealogical research are available at the state archive "Statny Archiv in Bytca, Slovakia"

 Roman Catholic church records (births/marriages/deaths): 1729-1895 (parish B)
 Lutheran church records (births/marriages/deaths): 1783-1951 (parish B)

See also
 List of municipalities and towns in Slovakia

External links
https://web.archive.org/web/20070427022352/http://www.statistics.sk/mosmis/eng/run.html
 Village website (in Slovak)
Surnames of living people in Benadikova

Villages and municipalities in Liptovský Mikuláš District